Phrynotettix tshivavensis, known generally as the Chihuahua lubber or Chihuahua toad hopper, is a species of lubber grasshopper in the family Romaleidae. It is found in North America.

Subspecies
These five subspecies belong to the species Phrynotettix tshivavensis:
 Phrynotettix tshivavensis magnus (Thomas, 1875) i c g
 Phrynotettix tshivavensis pusillus Rehn and Grant, 1959 i c g
 Phrynotettix tshivavensis taosanus Rehn, 1902 i c g
 Phrynotettix tshivavensis tshivavensis (Haldeman, 1852) i c g
 Phrynotettix tshivavensis verruculatus Glover, 1872 i c g
Data sources: i = ITIS, c = Catalogue of Life, g = GBIF, b = Bugguide.net

References

Romaleidae
Articles created by Qbugbot
Insects described in 1852
Taxa named by Samuel Stehman Haldeman